On November 30, 2022, a bombing of a madrasa in Aybak, Samangan Province, Afghanistan killed 17 people and injured 26 others. The majority of those killed were children. No group claimed responsibility.

References

See also 
 Terrorist incidents in Afghanistan in 2022
 September 2022 Kabul school bombing

2022 murders in Afghanistan
2020s building bombings
21st-century mass murder in Afghanistan
Attacks on buildings and structures in 2022
Mass murder in 2022
School bombings in Asia
Samangan Province
November 2022 events in Afghanistan
November 2022 crimes in Asia
Terrorist incidents in Afghanistan in 2022